Quensel Glacier is a small glacier flowing southeast into Cooper Bay at the east tip of South Georgia. It was named by the United Kingdom Antarctic Place-Names Committee (UK-APC) after Percy D. Quensel, Swedish geologist of Uppsala University, who visited South Georgia with Carl Skottsberg in 1909.

See also
 List of glaciers in the Antarctic
 Glaciology

References

Glaciers of South Georgia